The de Lens family is a bourgeois family of Brussels of which a branch settled in Paris in the century of Louis XIV.

Members
 Jean de Lens [fr] (1616-1689), goldsmith of Philippe I, Duke of Orléans.
 Jacques de Lens [fr] (1786-1846), doctor, founding member of the Academy of Medicine.

Heraldry

Family of the same name from Hainaut
 Anne de Lens, wife of Adrien de Dion, had her heart embalmed and deposited in a leaden reliquary in the Church of St. Jacques of Douai in 1580, where it was discovered during archaeological excavations in 2007.

See also
 Guilds of Brussels
 Bourgeois of Brussels
 Bourgeois of Paris

References

Authority
Content in this edit is translated from the existing French Wikipedia article at :fr:Famille de Lens; see its history for attribution.

External links
 Genealogy of the de Lens family

Belgian families
People from Brussels